Relax is the only studio album by American hip hop trio Das Racist. It was released by Greedhead Music on September 13, 2011. It peaked at number 111 on the Billboard 200 chart.

Production
The album is produced by Diplo, El-P, Rostam Batmanglij, and Anand Wilder, among others. It includes guest appearances from El-P, Danny Brown, and Despot.

Release
On August 2, 2011, Das Racist released "Michael Jackson", the lead single from the album. The music video for the song was premiered on September 9, 2011. Directed by Weird Days, the video references Michael Jackson's "Black or White" video, featuring the morphing faces of El-P, Despot, Lakutis, Hari Kondabolu, Mike Finito, Anand Wilder, Rostam Batmanglij, and Ben Schecter, among others.

The album was released by Greedhead Music on September 13, 2011.

Music videos were also created for "Brand New Dance" and "Girl".

Critical reception

At Metacritic, which assigns a weighted average score out of 100 to reviews from mainstream critics, the album received an average score of 78, based on 21 reviews, indicating "generally favorable reviews".

Tuyet Nguyen of The A.V. Club gave the album a "B+" grade, praising Das Racist's "acutely modern sense of humor." Jesse Cataldo of Slant Magazine gave the album 4 stars out of 5, saying, "Relax finds Das Racist operating as both consumers and creators of pop culture, spawning an endless pomo cycle of criticism and observation." Paul de Revere of Consequence of Sound called it "Das Racist's definitive album to date."

Accolades

Track listing

Personnel
Credits adapted from the liner notes.

 Kool A.D. – production (1, 2), artwork
 Heems – production (1, 2), executive production
 Patrick Wimberly – production (1, 2, 3, 8, 11), executive production, recording, mixing
 Travis Rosenberg – pedal steel guitar (2, 8)
 Anand Wilder – vocals (4), production (4)
 Blood Diamonds – production (5)
 El-P – vocals (6), production (6)
 Diplo – production (7)
 Lakutis – handclap (8)
 Danny Brown – vocals (9)
 Despot – vocals (9)
 Dash Speaks – production (9)
 Bikram Singh – vocals (10)
 J-La – production (10, 12)
 Rostam Batmanglij – production (13)
 Francis Farewell Starlite – production (14)
 Josh Ascalon – engineering (8, 11)
 Daniel Lynas – engineering (9)
 Chris Gehringer – mastering
 Katy Porter – photography

Charts

References

External links
 
 

2011 albums
Das Racist albums
Albums produced by Diplo
Albums produced by El-P
Albums produced by Patrick Wimberly
Albums produced by Rostam Batmanglij
Greedhead Music albums